Reeds Corners was a former community in the Town of Metomen, Fond du Lac County, Wisconsin, United States.

History
In 1852, a post office was established in Reeds Corners. In 1857, The "Second Congregational Church of Metomen" was founded. Reeds Corners had stores, shops, the railroad depot, and the post office. Then, in 1873, the railroad depot and post office was moved to the community of Metomen. Reeds Corner was named after a settler: Warren Reed who lived in the area.

Notes

Former populated places in Wisconsin
Geography of Fond du Lac County, Wisconsin
1852 establishments in Wisconsin